Banking in Pakistan formally began during the period of colonialism in South Asia, during which much of Pakistan was controlled by the British Empire. In 1947, Pakistan gained independence from the British Raj. After independence, the State Bank of Pakistan was established as the central bank of the country, with its headquarters in Karachi. Prior to independence, the Reserve Bank of India acted as the central bank for what became Pakistan.
 
In 2018, there were 50.565 million bank accounts in Pakistan for its population of 207.77 million, resulting in a penetration rate of 24.34%. There were 15,053 bank branches, 14,148 ATMs, and 53,269 POS machines active in the country.

On 28 April 2022, the Federal Shariat Court (FSC) announced a verdict in a case on Riba, declaring all the provisions of the Interest Act 1839, which facilitate interest, as unlawful. The FSC also declared the prevailing interest-based banking system as against the Shariah. The FSC ruled that the federal government and provincial governments must amend relevant laws and issued directives that Pakistan's banking system should be free of interest by December 2027.

Islamic Banking 
As of Sep, 2020, Islamic banking industry (IBI) assets and deposits of overall banking industry stood at stands at 16.0 percent and 17.3 percent, respectively.

As of Sep, 2020, infrastructure of IBI in Pakistan consist of 22 Islamic banking institutions (IBIs); 5 full-fledged Islamic banks (IBs) and 17 conventional banks having standalone Islamic banking branches (IBBs).

See also 
 State Bank of Pakistan
 List of banks in Pakistan

References